WVFG (107.5 FM) is an American radio station broadcasting an Urban/oldies gospel format. Licensed to serve the community of Uniontown, Alabama, the station is owned by Jones Communications .

References

External links

VFG
Radio stations established in 1995
1995 establishments in Alabama